Homún Municipality (in the Yucatec Maya language: “Five unripened”) is one of the 106 municipalities in the Mexican state of Yucatán containing  (192.89 km2) of land and located roughly 50 km southeast of the city of Mérida.

History
After the conquest, during the colonial period, the Municipality of Homún was founded as an encomienda first for Pedro Alvarez y Melchor Pacheco in 1549; Juan Vela in 1564; Juan Vela de Aguirre, Catalina de Rua and Santillán Gómez del Castillo in 1579; Pedro de Mézquita in 1629; Cristóbal Gutiérrez Flores, Juan del Castillo y Quiñones and Juan Serrano in 1687; Ana Serrano and Alonso de Aranda y Aguayo in 1710, who had control of 162 Indians; and finally Antonio del Castillo y Carrillo in 1725 who controlled 469 Indians.

In the modern era, in 1825, Homún became part of the Municipality of Sotuta and in 1829 the farm named Sutupil was joined with the municipality. In 1884 the location became a village in its own right.

Governance
The municipal president is elected for a term of three years. The president appoints seven Councilpersons to serve on the board for three year terms, as the Secretary and councilors of street lighting, public works, potable water, market and supply, parks and public gardens, public monuments, and nomenclature.

The Municipal Council administers the business of the municipality. It is responsible for budgeting and expenditures and producing all required reports for all branches of the municipal administration. Annually it determines educational standards for schools.

The Police Commissioners ensure public order and safety. They are tasked with enforcing regulations, distributing materials and administering rulings of general compliance issued by the council.

Communities
The municipality is made up of 8 communities, which are considered of importance Chichi Lagos, Homún, Kanpepén, Kanún, Polabán, San Antonio, San Isidro Ochil and Yalahán. Other minor communities are: Chan Santo, Cho-chich,  Culul, Kanka-Chen, Kan Kadzonot, Santa Cruz, Sintunil, and Sipchac.

Local festivals
Every year from the 6 to 14 July a fiesta is held in honor of San Buenaventura.

Tourist attractions
 Cenote Balmil
 Santa Maria Cave & Cenote
 Santa Rosa Cenote
 Tza Ujun Kat Cenote
 Yaxbakaltun Cenote
 Yalahau Lagoon

Archeological sites
 Kampepen
 Sión 
 Yalabau

Architectural sites
 Cathedral of St. Bonaventure
 Cathedral of St. James
 Hacienda Chichí de los Lagos
 Hacienda Polabán

External links
 Homun Cenotes

References

Municipalities of Yucatán